Liliya Tagirovna Aetbaeva (born 9 November 1993) is a Russian boxer.

She won a medal at the 2019 AIBA Women's World Boxing Championships.

References

1993 births
Living people
AIBA Women's World Boxing Championships medalists
Russian women boxers
People from Prokopyevsk
Flyweight boxers
World flyweight boxing champions
Sportspeople from Kemerovo Oblast